The 2017 Plano municipal election was an election to the Plano City Council in the city of Plano, Texas on May 6, 2017.  Along with the mayoral election (Place 6), seats were contested for Places 2, 4, and 8.

Since no candidate received more than 50% of the vote in Places 2 and 8, a runoff was held on June 10, 2017 for these races.

Council seats

Place 2
The incumbent, Ben Harris, was term-limited. Alfonso Valente, Ann Bacchus, and Anthony Ricciardelli stood for election.

Runoff
No candidate received 50% of the votes, so a runoff election was held on June 10, 2017.

Place 4
The incumbent, Lissa Smith, was term-limited. Kayci Prince and Edward "Ed" Acklin stood for election.

Place 6 (Mayor)
Incumbent mayor Harry LaRosiliere, the first African-American mayor of Plano, ran for re-election, and the challengers were Leilei "Lily" Bao, Bill Lisle III, and Douglas Reeves.

Place 8
David Downs, the incumbent, along with Stirling Morris and Rick Smith, stood for election.

Runoff
No candidate received 50% of the votes, so a runoff election was held on June 10, 2017.

Propositions

Proposition 1
The following question appeared on the ballot:

Proposition 2
The following question appeared on the ballot:

Proposition 3
The following question appeared on the ballot:

Proposition 4
The following question appeared on the ballot:

Proposition 5
The following question appeared on the ballot:

Proposition 6
The following question appeared on the ballot:

References

External links
Plano City Elections
Collin County - Plano elections, 2017

Plano, Texas
2017
Plano, Texas